Kaniogo is a small town and commune in the Cercle of Kangaba in the Koulikoro Region of south-western Mali. As of 1998 the commune had a population of 11415.

Mamadore Traore being the first democratically elected mayor of Kaniogo in all of Mali.

References

Communes of Koulikoro Region